Calophaenoidea arrowi is a species of beetle in the family Carabidae, the only species in the genus Calophaenoidea.

References

Lebiinae